Claude Brodin (30 July 1934 – 17 October 2014) was a French fencer. He won a bronze medal in the team épée event at the 1964 Summer Olympics.

References

External links
 

1934 births
2014 deaths
French male épée fencers
Olympic fencers of France
Fencers at the 1960 Summer Olympics
Fencers at the 1964 Summer Olympics
Olympic bronze medalists for France
Olympic medalists in fencing
Medalists at the 1964 Summer Olympics
20th-century French people